Akkuli, until 2018 Lebyazhye is a district of Pavlodar Region in northern Kazakhstan. The administrative center of the district is the selo of Akkuli (Aqquly; formerly Akku, Aqqu (2018-1996); Lebyazhye ( (until 1996)). Population: 12444 (on January 1, 2018 estimate);   

On 4 August 2018 President of the Republic of Kazakhstan Nursultan Nazarbayev adopted decree to rename Lebyazhye District to Akkuli District.

External links
 Map of Akkuli (Lebyazhye) District on Akimat of Akkuli (Lebyazhye) District website

References

Districts of Kazakhstan
Pavlodar Region